S. Kathavarayan (c. 1962 – 28 February 2020) was an Indian politician and a member of the Legislative Assembly of Tamil Nadu. He was elected to the Tamil Nadu legislative assembly as a Dravida Munnetra Kazhagam candidate from Gudiyattam constituency in the by-election in 2019. He died in Chennai where he was admitted for a heart ailment on 28 February 2020.

References 

Dravida Munnetra Kazhagam politicians
Members of the Tamil Nadu Legislative Assembly
People from Vellore district
1962 births
2020 deaths